The 610s decade ran from January 1, 610, to December 31, 619.

Significant people

References

Sources

 
 
 
 
  Date range in the title as printed, also appears in searches as 363–628.